少年四大名捕 may refer to:

The Four (2008 TV series), a Hong Kong Cantonese-language television series
The Four (2015 TV series), a Mainland Chinese Mandarin-language television series

See also